Julio Díaz Sánchez (born 16 April 1948) is a Spanish football coach and former player.

Manager career
Díaz was born in Cesuras, A Coruña, Galicia, and played for SD Compostela, AD Ceuta and CD Díter Zafra. As a manager, he achieved an incredible run in the 1987–88 Copa del Rey with Bergantiños FC, only being knocked out by Rayo Vallecano.

In 1988 Díaz was appointed CD Lugo manager. He was sacked the following year, but eventually returned to the club in 1990.

In 2000, after a stint at Pontevedra CF, Díaz returned to the Albivermellos, and despite leaving the club at the end of the campaign, was again appointed on 19 September 2001. He was sacked in December 2002, and ended his spell at the club with 214 matches in charge, behind only Quique Setién.

On 14 March 2007, Díaz was named SD Negreira manager. Roughly one year later, he was dismissed.

References

External links

1948 births
Living people
People from Betanzos (comarca)
Sportspeople from the Province of A Coruña
Spanish footballers
Footballers from Galicia (Spain)
SD Compostela footballers
AD Ceuta footballers
Spanish football managers
CD Lugo managers
Pontevedra CF managers
Association footballers not categorized by position